Alexander Grace (born 20 March 1974) is a Scottish former footballer who played for Morton, Dumbarton and Stranraer.

References

1974 births
Scottish footballers
Dumbarton F.C. players
Greenock Morton F.C. players
Stranraer F.C. players
Scottish Football League players
Association football midfielders
Footballers from West Dunbartonshire
Living people
Place of birth missing (living people)